Leptotyphlops brevissimus, or the Caqueta blind snake, is a species of snake in the family Leptotyphlopidae.

References

Leptotyphlopidae
Reptiles of Colombia
Reptiles described in 1964
Taxa named by Benjamin Shreve